Sanderson may refer to:

Places
 Sanderson, Florida, a town in the United States
 Sanderson, Texas, a census-designated place in the United States
 Sanderson, West Virginia, an unincorporated community in the United States
 Sanderson, Northern Territory, an area of Darwin, Australia
 Electoral division of Sanderson, in Australia
 Sanderson Farms, a US-based poultry producer
 Sanderson High School (Texas)
 Sanderson High School, East Kilbride, South Lanarkshire, Scotland
 Sanderson Hotel in London

People
 Sanderson (surname), people with the surname Sanderson
 Sanderson, a pixie who works with Head Pixie in the cartoon The Fairly OddParents

Brands
 Arthur Sanderson & Sons Ltd, a British fabric and wallpaper manufacturer

See also
 Angus-Sanderson, an English automobile
 Jesse O. Sanderson High School, Raleigh, North Carolina USA
 Sanders (surname)